János Konkoly (3 January 1940 – 13 October 2018) was a Hungarian diver. He competed in two events at the 1960 Summer Olympics.

References

External links
 

1940 births
2018 deaths
Hungarian male divers
Olympic divers of Hungary
Divers at the 1960 Summer Olympics
Divers from Budapest
Sportspeople from Budapest